Azorus or Azoros ( or Ἀζώριον) was a town and polis (city-state) in Perrhaebia in ancient Thessaly situated at the foot of Mount Olympus. Azorus, with the two neighbouring towns of Pythium and Doliche, formed a Tripolis. 

During the Roman–Seleucid War, the Tripolis was ravaged by an army of the Aetolian League in the year 191 BCE. During the Third Macedonian War the three towns surrendered to the army of Perseus of Macedon in the year 171 BCE, but that same year the Romans reconquered the three. In the year 169 BCE troops arrived from the Roman consul Quintus Marcius Philippus who camped between Azorus and Doliche.

The three cities minted a common coin with the inscription "ΤΡΙΠΟΛΙΤΑΝ".

The site of Azorus is the palaiokastro (old fort) at the modern village of Azoros.

References

Former populated places in Greece
Cities in ancient Greece
Populated places in ancient Thessaly
Perrhaebia
Mount Olympus
Thessalian city-states